Pinhas Hozez (פנחס חוזז; born September 8, 1957) is an Israeli former basketball player. He played the forward position. He played in the Israeli Basketball Premier League and for the Israeli national basketball team.

Biography
Hozez was born in Jaffa, Israel. He is 1.98 meters tall.

He attended the University of Portland. Hozez played basketball for the Portland Pilots in the 1979–80 season.

Hozez played in the Israeli Basketball Premier League. Between 1974 and 1995 he competed for Israeli teams Hapoel Tel Aviv, Beitar Tel Aviv, Elitzur Ramla, Hapoel Haifa, and Bnei Herzliya Basket.

He also played for the Israeli national basketball team. Hozez competed in the 1974 FIBA European Championship for Junior Men, 1977 FIBA European Championship for Men, 1979 FIBA European Championship for Men, 1980 FIBA European Olympic Qualifying Tournament for Men, and 1981 FIBA European Championship for Men.

References 

1957 births
Living people
Israeli men's basketball players
Portland Pilots men's basketball players
Hapoel Tel Aviv B.C. players
Hapoel Haifa B.C. players
Israeli Basketball Premier League players